William A. Rennie (1854-1919) was a jurist and journalist in Southern California, the founder of the Venice Vanguard.

Personal life

Rennie was born in 1854 in Illinois, the son of William A. Renne of England and Hannah Renne of New York.

Rennie and Sarah E. Emerson were married on December 3, 1883, in Chicago, Illinois. They came to Los Angeles in 1885.
They had two sons, Robert and Walter.

Rennie died on January 22, 1919, in Sacramento, California, of an "attack of pneumonia" or of "influenza." Funeral services were conducted in Santa Monica on January 25 under the auspices of the Elks Lodge. Interment was at Rosedale Cemetery, Los Angeles.

Career

Rennie worked on the Los Angeles Times, then founded the Venice Vanguard in 1907. He was vice president of the Southern California Editorial Association.

A Progressive, he was appointed justice of the peace of Ballona Township in Venice, California, on January 10, 1910, succeeding H.C. Rogers, who had moved to San Francisco. He was also city recorder for Venice, California. In that office he presided over the police court.

In October 1910 Rennie sued Raymond Wayman of the Wilmington Journal, alleging libel and asking $50,000 in damages.He claimed that the Journal, in an article headlined "The Squealing of a Rat," had called him a "cheap little squirt" who "stole editorials," a "lovely ass," and a "long-tailed sewer rat." He said the article painted him as "out of sympathy" with the families of the victims of the 1910 Los Angeles Times bombing.

In 1911, the Vanguard's ownership consisted of William A. Rennie, Robert R. Rennie, Walter W. Rennie, and Mrs. S.E. Rennie.

References

1854 births
1919 deaths
Los Angeles Times people
American justices of the peace
Recorder (judge)
20th-century American journalists